Pyotr Viktorovich Ilyichev (born 11 March 1966) is a Russian diplomat, first deputy of Permanent Representative of Russia to the United Nations.

From 20 February to 27 July 2017, Ilichov was the acting Representative of Russia to the United Nations.

References

|-

1966 births
Living people
Permanent Representatives of Russia to the United Nations